Hotel Imperial is a hotel in Opatija and was the second hotel on the Adriatic coast. It opened in 1885 and is built in the Art Nouveau style.

History 
Hotel Imperial was built in 1884-85. It was constructed by the Austrian Southern Railway Company as a means to increase regional use of the railway. Other projects designed to increase railway use in Opatija were the first hotel of the area, Hotel Quarnero (Kvarner), the town's promenade and several parks. These projects turned Opatija into a successful early tourism centre in Austria-Hungary, which declared the region the empire's first "climactic seaside resort".

References

Sources 

Hotels in Croatia
Art Nouveau architecture in Croatia
Art Nouveau hotels
Buildings and structures in Primorje-Gorski Kotar County